This is a list of foreign ministers in 2009.

Africa
 Algeria - Mourad Medelci (2007–2013)
 Angola - Assunção dos Anjos (2008–2010)
 Benin - Jean-Marie Ehouzou (2008–2011)
 Botswana - Phandu Skelemani (2008–2014)
 Burkina Faso - Alain Bédouma Yoda (2008–2011)
 Burundi -
Antoinette Batumubwira (2005–2009)
Augustin Nsanze (2009–2011)
 Cameroon - Henri Eyebe Ayissi (2007–2011)
 Cape Verde - José Brito (2008–2011)
 Central African Republic -
Dieudonné Kombo Yaya (2008–2009)
Antoine Gambi (2009–2013)
 Chad - Moussa Faki (2008–2017)
 Comoros - Ahmed Ben Said Jaffar (2006–2010)
 Republic of Congo - Basile Ikouébé (2007–2015)
 Democratic Republic of Congo - Alexis Thambwe Mwamba (2008–2012)
 Côte d'Ivoire - Youssouf Bakayoko (2006–2010)
 Djibouti - Mahamoud Ali Youssouf (2005–present)
 Egypt - Ahmed Aboul Gheit (2004–2011)
 Equatorial Guinea - Pastor Micha Ondó Bile (2003–2012)
 Eritrea - Osman Saleh Mohammed (2007–present)
 Ethiopia - Seyoum Mesfin (1991–2010)
 Gabon - Paul Toungui (2008–2012)
 The Gambia -
 Omar Touray (2008–2009)
 Ousman Jammeh (2009–2010)
 Ghana -
Akwasi Osei-Adjei (2007–2009)
Muhammad Mumuni (2009–2013)
 Guinea -
Amadou Lamarana Bah (2008–2009)
Alexandre Cécé Loua (2009–2010)
 Guinea-Bissau -
Maria da Conceição Nobre Cabral (2007–2009)
Adiato Djaló Nandigna (2009)
Adelino Mano Quetá (2009–2011)
 Kenya - Moses Wetangula (2008–2012)
 Lesotho - Mohlabi Tsekoa (2007–2015)
 Liberia - Olubanke King-Akerele (2007–2010)
 Libya -
Abdel Rahman Shalgham (2000–2009)
Moussa Koussa (2009–2011)
 Madagascar -
Marcel Ranjeva (2002–2009)
Ny Hasina Andriamanjato (2009–2010)
 Malawi -
Joyce Banda (2006–2009)
Etta Banda (2009–2011)
 Mali -  Moctar Ouane (2004–2011)
 Mauritania -
 Mohamed Mahmoud Ould Mohamedou (2008–2009)
 Naha Mint Mouknass (2009–2011)
 Mauritius - Arvin Boolell (2008–2014)
 Morocco - Taieb Fassi Fihri (2007–2012)
 Western Sahara - Mohamed Salem Ould Salek (1998–2023)
 Mozambique - Oldemiro Balói (2008–2017)
 Namibia - Marco Hausiku (2004–2010)
 Niger - Aïchatou Mindaoudou (2001–2010)
 Nigeria - Ojo Maduekwe (2007–2010)
 Rwanda -
 Rosemary Museminari (2008–2009)
 Louise Mushikiwabo (2009–2018)
 São Tomé and Príncipe - Carlos Tiny (2008–2010)
 Senegal -
 Cheikh Tidiane Gadio (2000–2009)
 Madické Niang (2009–2012)
 Seychelles -
 Patrick Pillay (2005–2009)
 James Michel (2009–2010)
 Sierra Leone - Zainab Bangura (2007–2010)
 Somalia -
Ali Ahmed Jama Jangali (2008–2009)
Mohamed Abdullahi Omar (2009)
Ali Ahmed Jama Jangali (2009–2010)
 Somaliland - Abdillahi Mohamed Duale (2006–2010)
 Puntland - Farah Adan Dhala (2009–2010)
 South Africa -
 Nkosazana Dlamini-Zuma (1999–2009)
 Maite Nkoana-Mashabane (2009–2018)
 Sudan - Deng Alor (2007–2010)
 Swaziland - Lutfo Dlamini (2008–2011)
 Tanzania – Bernard Membe (2007–2015)
 Togo - Kofi Esaw (2008–2010)
 Tunisia - Abdelwahab Abdallah (2005–2010)
 Uganda - Sam Kutesa (2005–2021)
 Zambia - Kabinga Pande (2007–2011)
 Zimbabwe - Simbarashe Mumbengegwi (2005–2017)

Asia
 Afghanistan - Rangin Dadfar Spanta (2006–2010)
 Armenia - Eduard Nalbandyan (2008–2018)
 Azerbaijan - Elmar Mammadyarov (2004–2020)
 Nagorno-Karabakh - Georgy Petrosyan (2005–2011)
 Bahrain - Sheikh Khalid ibn Ahmad Al Khalifah (2005–2020)
 Bangladesh –
Iftekhar Ahmed Chowdhury (2007–2009)
Dipu Moni (2009–2013)
 Bhutan - Ugyen Tshering (2008–2013)
 Brunei - Pengiran Muda Mohamed Bolkiah (1984–2015)
 Cambodia - Hor Namhong (1998–2016)
 China - Yang Jiechi (2007–2013)
 East Timor - Zacarias da Costa (2007–2012)
 Georgia - Grigol Vashadze (2008–2012)
 Abkhazia - Sergei Shamba (2004–2010)
 South Ossetia - Murat Dzhioyev (1998–2012)
 India -
Pranab Mukherjee (2006–2009)
S. M. Krishna (2009–2012)
 Indonesia -
 Hassan Wirajuda (2001–2009)
 Marty Natalegawa (2009–2014)
 Iran - Manouchehr Mottaki (2005–2010)
 Iraq - Hoshyar Zebari (2003–2014)
 Kurdistan - Falah Mustafa Bakir (2006–2019)
 Israel -
Tzipi Livni (2006–2009)
Avigdor Lieberman (2009–2012)
 Palestinian Authority - Riyad al-Maliki (2007–present)
 Japan -
Hirofumi Nakasone (2008–2009)
Katsuya Okada (2009–2010)
 Jordan -
 Salah Bashir (2007–2009)
 Nasser Judeh (2009–2017)
 Kazakhstan –
 Marat Tazhin (2007–2009)
 Kanat Saudabayev (2009–2011)
 North Korea - Pak Ui-chun (2007–2014)
 South Korea - Yu Myung-hwan (2008–2010)
 Kuwait - Sheikh Mohammad Sabah Al-Salem Al-Sabah (2003–2011)
 Kyrgyzstan -
Ednan Karabayev (2007–2009)
Kadyrbek Sarbayev (2009–2010)
 Laos - Thongloun Sisoulith (2006–2016)
 Lebanon -
 Fawzi Salloukh (2005–2009)
 Ali Al Shami (2009–2011)
 Malaysia -
Rais Yatim (2008–2009)
Anifah Aman (2009–2018)
 Maldives - Ahmed Shaheed (2008–2011)
 Mongolia -
 Sükhbaataryn Batbold (2008–2009)
 Gombojavyn Zandanshatar (2009–2012)
 Myanmar - Nyan Win (2004–2011)
 Nepal -
Upendra Yadav (2008–2009)
Sujata Koirala (2009–2011)
 Oman - Yusuf bin Alawi bin Abdullah (1982–2020)
 Pakistan - Shah Mehmood Qureshi (2008–2011)
 Philippines - Alberto Romulo (2004–2011)
 Qatar - Sheikh Hamad bin Jassim bin Jaber Al Thani (1992–2013)

 Saudi Arabia - Prince Saud bin Faisal bin Abdulaziz Al Saud (1975–2015)
 Singapore - George Yeo (2004–2011)
 Sri Lanka - Rohitha Bogollagama (2007–2010)
 Syria - Walid Muallem (2006–2020)
 Taiwan -
 Francisco Ou (2008–2009)
 Timothy Yang (2009–2012)
 Tajikistan - Khamrokhon Zaripov (2006–2013)
 Thailand - Kasit Piromya (2008–2011)
 Turkey -
Ali Babacan (2007–2009)
Ahmet Davutoğlu (2009–2014)
 Turkmenistan - Raşit Meredow (2001–present)
 United Arab Emirates - Sheikh Abdullah bin Zayed Al Nahyan (2006–present)
 Uzbekistan - Vladimir Norov (2006–2010)
 Vietnam - Phạm Gia Khiêm (2006–2011)
 Yemen - Abu Bakr al-Qirbi (2001–2014)

Europe
 Albania -
Lulzim Basha (2007–2009)
Ilir Meta (2009–2010)
 Andorra -
Meritxell Mateu i Pi (2007–2009)
Xavier Espot Miró (2009–2011)
 Austria - Michael Spindelegger (2008–2013)
 Belarus - Sergei Martynov (2003–2012)
 Belgium -
 Karel De Gucht (2004–2009)
 Yves Leterme (2009)
 Steven Vanackere (2009–2011)
 Brussels-Capital Region -
 Guy Vanhengel (2000–2009)
 Jean-Luc Vanraes (2009–2013)
 Flanders - Kris Peeters (2008–2014)
 Wallonia -
 Marie-Dominique Simonet (2004–2009)
 Rudy Demotte (2009–2014)
 Bosnia and Herzegovina - Sven Alkalaj (2007–2012)
 Bulgaria -
 Ivailo Kalfin (2005–2009)
 Rumiana Jeleva (2009–2010)
 Croatia - Gordan Jandroković (2008–2011)
 Cyprus - Markos Kyprianou (2008–2011)
 Northern Cyprus
 Turgay Avcı (2006–2009)
 Hüseyin Özgürgün (2009–2013)
 Czech Republic
 Karel Schwarzenberg (2007–2009)
 Jan Kohout (2009–2010)
 Denmark - Per Stig Møller (2001–2010)
 Greenland -
 Per Berthelsen (2008–2009)
 Kuupik Kleist (2009–2013)
 Faroe Islands - Jørgen Niclasen (2008–2011)
 Estonia - Urmas Paet (2005–2014)
 Finland - Alexander Stubb (2008–2011)
 France - Bernard Kouchner (2007–2010)
 Germany -
 Frank-Walter Steinmeier (2005–2009)
 Guido Westerwelle (2009–2013)
 Greece -
 Dora Bakoyannis (2006–2009)
 George Papandreou (2009–2010)
 Hungary -
Kinga Göncz (2006–2009)
Péter Balázs (2009–2010)
 Iceland -
Ingibjörg Sólrún Gísladóttir (2007–2009)
Össur Skarphéðinsson (2009–2013)
 Ireland - Micheál Martin (2008–2011)
 Italy - Franco Frattini (2008–2011)
 Latvia - Māris Riekstiņš (2007–2010)
 Liechtenstein -
Rita Kieber-Beck (2005–2009)
Aurelia Frick (2009–2019)
 Lithuania - Vygaudas Ušackas (2008–2010)
 Luxembourg - Jean Asselborn (2004–present)
 Macedonia - Antonio Milošoski (2006–2011)
 Malta - Tonio Borg (2008–2012)
 Moldova -
Andrei Stratan (2004–2009)
Iurie Leancă (2009–2013)
 Transnistria - Vladimir Yastrebchak (2008–2012)
 Monaco - Franck Biancheri (2008–2011)
 Montenegro - Milan Roćen (2006–2012)
 Netherlands - Maxime Verhagen (2007–2010)
 Norway - Jonas Gahr Støre (2005–2012)
 Poland - Radosław Sikorski (2007–2014)
 Portugal - Luís Amado (2006–2011)
 Romania -
 Cristian Diaconescu (2008–2009)
 Cătălin Predoiu (acting) (2009)
 Teodor Baconschi (2009–2012)
 Russia - Sergey Lavrov (2004–present)
 San Marino - Antonella Mularoni (2008–2012)
 Serbia - Vuk Jeremić (2007–2012)
 Kosovo - Skënder Hyseni (2008–2010)
 Slovakia -
Ján Kubiš (2006–2009)
Miroslav Lajčák (2009–2010)
 Slovenia - Samuel Žbogar (2008–2012)
 Spain - Miguel Ángel Moratinos (2004–2010)
 Sweden - Carl Bildt (2006–2014)
 Switzerland - Micheline Calmy-Rey (2003–2011)

 Ukraine -
Volodymyr Ohryzko (2007–2009)
Volodymyr Khandohiy (acting) (2009)
Petro Poroshenko (2009–2010)
 United Kingdom - David Miliband (2007–2010)
 Scotland -
 Linda Fabiani (2007–2009)
 Michael Russell (2009)
 Fiona Hyslop (2009–2020)
 Vatican City - Archbishop Dominique Mamberti (2006–2014)

North America and the Caribbean
 Antigua and Barbuda - Baldwin Spencer (2005–2014)
 The Bahamas - Brent Symonette (2007–2012)
 Barbados - Maxine McClean (2008–2018)
 Belize - Wilfred Elrington (2008–2020)
 Canada - Lawrence Cannon (2008–2011)
 Quebec - Pierre Arcand (2008–2010)
 Costa Rica - Bruno Stagno Ugarte (2006–2010)
 Cuba -
 Felipe Pérez Roque (1999–2009)
 Bruno Rodríguez Parrilla (2009–present)
 Dominica - Vince Henderson (2008–2010)
 Dominican Republic - Carlos Morales Troncoso (2004–2014)
 El Salvador -
 Marisol Argueta de Barillas (2008–2009)
 Hugo Martínez (2009–2013)
 Grenada - Peter David (2008–2010)
 Guatemala - Haroldo Rodas (2008–2012)
 Haiti -
 Alrich Nicolas (2008–2009)
 Marie-Michèle Rey (2009–2011)
 Honduras -
Ángel Edmundo Orellana (2008–2009)
Patricia Rodas (2009)
Enrique Ortez (2009)
Carlos López Contreras (2009–2010)
 Jamaica - Kenneth Baugh (2007–2012)
 Mexico - Patricia Espinosa (2006–2012)
 Netherlands Antilles - Emily de Jongh-Elhage (2006–2010)
 Nicaragua - Samuel Santos López (2007–2017)
 Panama -
Samuel Lewis Navarro (2004–2009)
Juan Carlos Varela (2009–2011)
 Puerto Rico –
Fernando Bonilla (2005–2009)
Kenneth McClintock (2009–2013)
 Saint Kitts and Nevis - Denzil Douglas (2008–2010)
 Saint Lucia -
Stephenson King (2007–2009)
Rufus Bousquet (2009–2011)
 Saint Vincent and the Grenadines - Sir Louis Straker (2005–2010)
 Trinidad and Tobago - Paula Gopee-Scoon (2007–2010)
 United States of America -
Condoleezza Rice (2005–2009)
William J. Burns (acting) (2009)
Hillary Clinton (2009–2013)

Oceania
 Australia - Stephen Smith (2007–2010)
 Fiji -
Frank Bainimarama (2008–2009)
Ratu Inoke Kubuabola   (2009–2016)
 French Polynesia -
 Gaston Tong Sang (2008–2009)
 Oscar Temaru (2009)
 Gaston Tong Sang (2009–2011)
 Kiribati - Anote Tong (2003–2016)
 Marshall Islands -
 Tony deBrum (2008–2009)
 John Silk (2009–2012)
 Micronesia - Lorin S. Robert (2007–2019)
 Nauru - Kieren Keke (2007–2011)
 New Zealand - Murray McCully (2008–2017)
 Cook Islands -
 Wilkie Rasmussen (2005–2009)
 Jim Marurai (2009)
 Sir Terepai Maoate (2009)
 Jim Marurai (2009–2010)
 Niue - Toke Talagi (2008–2020)
 Tokelau -
Pio Tuia (2008–2009)
Foua Toloa (2009–2010)
 Palau -
Temmy Shmull (2001–2009)
Sandra Pierantozzi (2009–2010)
 Papua New Guinea - Sam Abal (2007–2010)
 Samoa - Tuilaepa Aiono Sailele Malielegaoi (1998–2021)
 Solomon Islands - William Haomae (2007–2010)
 Tonga -
 Sonatane Tu'a Taumoepeau Tupou (2004–2009)
 Feleti Sevele (2009–2010)
 Tuvalu - Apisai Ielemia (2006–2010)
 Vanuatu -
 Pakoa Kaltonga (2008–2009)
 Joe Natuman (2009–2010)

South America
 Argentina - Jorge Taiana (2005–2010)
 Bolivia - David Choquehuanca (2006–2017)
 Brazil - Celso Amorim (2003–2011)
 Chile -
 Alejandro Foxley (2006–2009)
 Mariano Fernández Amunátegui (2009–2010)
 Colombia - Jaime Bermúdez (2008–2010)
 Ecuador - Fander Falconí (2008–2010)
 Guyana - Carolyn Rodrigues (2008–2015)
 Paraguay -
 Alejandro Hamed (2008–2009)
 Héctor Lacognata (2009–2011)
 Peru - JJosé Antonio García Belaúnde (2006–2011)
 Suriname - Lygia Kraag-Keteldijk (2005–2010)
 Uruguay -
 Gonzalo Fernández (2008–2009)
 Pedro Vaz (2009–2010)
 Venezuela - Nicolás Maduro (2006–2013)

References
http://rulers.org

2009 in international relations
Foreign ministers
2009